Kiliaen or Killian (variations include Killiaen, Kilian, Kilean) van Rensselaer is the name of:

Kiliaen van Rensselaer (merchant) (c. 1590–c. 1640), Dutch diamond merchant and first patroon of Rensselaerswyck
Kiliaen van Rensselaer (fourth patroon) (born 1663), member of the New York General Assembly and fourth patroon of Rensselaerswyck
Kiliaen Van Rensselaer (fifth patroon) (1663–1719), fifth patroon of Rensselaerswyck
Kiliaen van Rensselaer (colonel) (1717–1781), colonel of the 4th Regiment, Albany County Militia
Killian K. Van Rensselaer (1763–1845), member of the United States House of Representatives from New York
Kiliaen Van Rensselaer (businessman) , Founder and CEO of Insurrection Media